Frank C. Johnson (? – November 1890) was an American football player and coach. He was the fourth head football at the University of Richmond in Richmond, Virginia, serving for season, in 1889 season, and compiling a record of 1–2.

Johnson died of a malaria or typhoid fever at the home of his father, a prominent jeweler, in 1890.

Head coaching record

References

Year of birth missing
1890 deaths
19th-century players of American football
Player-coaches
Richmond Spiders football coaches
Richmond Spiders football players
Coaches of American football from Virginia
Players of American football from Virginia
Deaths from typhoid fever